The climate of New Jersey classification of the U.S. state of New Jersey is humid subtropical in South Jersey with a humid continental climate in North Jersey, particularly in the northwestern area of the state. The northwest part of New Jersey is the snowiest due to the higher elevations that earn it a Dfb classification. During the winters, New Jersey can experience Nor'easters, which are snowstorms that affect the Northeastern United States, and Atlantic Canada. However, many would-be snow events in the state end up turning to rain due to warm ocean air being brought in by the storm.  New Jersey's climate is shaped by its proximity to the Atlantic Ocean which provides moisture and moderates temperatures. According to climatology research by the U.S. National Oceanic and Atmospheric Administration, New Jersey has been the fastest-warming state by average air temperature over a 100-year period beginning in the early 20th century, related to global warming.

Temperatures

Temperatures are usually coolest in the northwestern part of the state and warmest in the southern part of the state. The temperature difference is greatest in the winter and the least in the summer. All parts of the state have recorded temperatures below 0 degrees and in excess of 100 degrees. The average number of freeze free days ranges from 163 days in the highlands to 217 along the coast. The highest recorded temperature in the state of New Jersey was 110° on July 10, 1936 in Runyon and the lowest was -34°F in River Vale on January 5, 1904.  The hardiness zone ranges from 5b in high areas of Sussex County to 8a in parts of Atlantic City and Cape May.

Precipitation
The average annual precipitation in New Jersey ranges from 40 inches along the southeastern coast to around 51 inches in the north-central part of the state. The driest season is usually autumn which has an average of 8 days per month with measurable precipitation. During other seasons the average month has between 9 and 12 days of precipitation. Most areas receive between 25-30 thunderstorms a year. While tornadoes are possible, they tend to be rare and weak. There are usually about five tornadoes reported each year statewide. The greatest 24-hour rainfall was 14.81 inches, which occurred in Tuckerton on August 19 - 20, 1939.

Snowfall
Snow is relatively common in New Jersey, with most of it occurring between November 15 and April 15. Significant snowfall is much rarer along the coastline and in South Jersey than in Interior North Jersey.  The record for 24-hour snowfall is 32 inches in Rutherford on December 14, 1915. The greatest snow depth ever recorded was 52 inches at the Canistear Reservoir in Vernon Township on February 5, 1961.

Climate change 

Climate change is affecting New Jersey faster than much of the rest of the United States. New Jersey has warmed up faster than any other U.S. state by average air temperature over a 100-year period beginning in the early 20th century.

Climate data for select cities

References

Notes

New Jersey
Environment of New Jersey